Jeremy Lalrinnunga is an Indian weightlifter from Aizawl, Mizoram. He represented India in the 2018 Summer Youth Olympics in Buenos Aires. He won the gold medal in the Boys' 62 kg category weightlifting with a lift of 274 kg (124 kg in snatch and 150 kg in clean and jerk). It was India's first gold medal in the Youth Olympic Games. Jeremy won silver medal in Asian weightlifting championship. At the 2019 World Weightlifting Championships, Lalrinnunga finished at 21st rank at the Men's 67 kg event. He won gold in the 2022 Commonwealth Games, in the 67 kg category, with a game record lift of 140 kg in snatch and 160 kg in clean and jerk.

Early life 
Lalrinnunga was born on October 26, 2002, in Aizawl, Mizoram. In the early 1990s, his father Lalneihtluanga Ralte was well-known on the Mizoram boxing circuit. Jeremy comes from a lowly background because his family circumstances prevented him for a very long time from pursuing his aspirations. His father began working as a labourer on contract with the neighbourhood Public Works Department in an effort to provide for his family (PWD).

Indian army 
Lalrinnunga joined the Indian army in May 2019 as a Naib Subedar in the 17th Battalion of the Brigade of the Guards.

Major results

References

External links

Living people
2002 births
People from Aizawl
Indian male weightlifters
Weightlifters from Mizoram
Weightlifters at the 2018 Summer Youth Olympics
Youth Olympic gold medalists for India
Weightlifters at the 2022 Commonwealth Games
Commonwealth Games gold medallists for India
Commonwealth Games medallists in weightlifting
Medallists at the 2022 Commonwealth Games